Güləh (also, Gyulakh, Gyulekh, and Gyunesh) is a village in the Shabran District of Azerbaijan.  The village forms part of the municipality of Çaraq.

References 

Populated places in Shabran District